Proliferating trichilemmal cysts (also known as a "Pilar tumor", "Proliferating follicular cystic neoplasm", "Proliferating pilar tumor", and "Proliferating trichilemmal tumor") are a cutaneous condition characterized by proliferations of squamous cells forming scroll-like structures.

See also 
 Trichilemmal cyst
 List of skin conditions

References

External links 

Epidermal nevi, neoplasms, and cysts